Rueda de Casino (rueda) is a  type of salsa round dance, born from the Cuban dance casino.

History 
Casino was developed in Havana, Cuba in the early 1950s. Casino traces its origin as a partner dance from Cuban Urban Son and Cuban Cha Cha Cha, fused with partner figures and turns adopted from the Cuban Mambo, Rumba Guaguancó and North American Jive. Casino is different from other types of Salsa dance styles because of its spontaneous use of the rich Afro-Cuban dance vocabulary within a Casino dance; a Casino dancer frequently improvises references to other dances, integrating movements, gestures and extended passages from the folkloric and popular heritage. This is particularly true of African descended Cubans. Such improvisations might include extracts of rumba, dances for African deities (Orishas), the older popular dances such as Cha Cha Cha and Danzón as well as anything the dancer may feel.

Casino danced with multiple partners in a circular fashion emerged in 1956 under the name "Rueda del Casino". This dance was exclusively danced at the Club Casino Deportivo, but quickly spread to other clubs around the beachfronts and later to the capital. While the dance became popular so did the phrases "vamos a hacer la rueda como en el Casino" (let's go dance "rueda" like in the Casino) and "vamos a hacer la rueda del Casino" (let's go dance "rueda" of the Casino). Given the popularity of the music and dance, numerous Rueda de Casino dance groups appeared on the island made up of friends, family members, and professional dancers. At the end of the 1970s, Rueda de Casino groups became well-known through the popular TV show "Para Bailar".

As a result of the Castro regime, many Cubans emigrated to the US, many to the Miami area. They took their culture with them, including various dishes, music and dancing. Rueda de Casino began to slowly make its way into the Miami salsa community during the Mariel boatlift, and in the late 1980s and early 1990s it experienced an enormous explosion of popularity. However, the style of Rueda de Casino that became popular was a style somewhat different from its original form. Rene Gueits, founder of "Salsa Lovers" in 1994, changed the Cuban-style Rueda de Casino and structured it. Rene's style adapted the Rueda de Casino steps into a more "disco-like" style, where the Cuban Urban Son, Cuban Cha Cha Cha, and Rumba Guaguancó were completely removed.

From Miami, Rueda de Casino spread first to major U.S. metropolitan centers with large Hispanic populations and eventually to other cities, becoming a popular dance around the United States and the world. Although the majority of the Rueda de Casino dancers have learned from the Miami-style Rueda de Casino syllabus and repertoire, many dancers from Cuba have been able to share the original version of the dance throughout the world, and most recently in the United States.

In 2014, the first International Rueda de Casino Multi Flash Mob took place in which people from 67 countries, including 199 cities, danced Rueda de Casino simultaneously. In 2017, the International Rueda de Casino Multi Flash Mob drew 230 unique groups dancing Rueda de Casino. The differences between the Miami-style Rueda de Casino and the Cuban-style Rueda de Casino are stark, and these differences can be seen throughout the performances of the 230 groups that participated in 2017.

Description 
Pairs of dancers form a circle, with dance moves called out by one person, a caller (or "líder" or "cantante" in Spanish). Many moves have hand signs to complement the calls; these are useful in noisy venues, where spoken calls might not be easily heard. Most moves involve the swapping of partners, where the partners move around the circle to the next partner. The combination of elaborate dance combinations and constant movement of partners create a visually spectacular effect.

The names of the moves are mostly in Spanish, some in English (or Spanglish; e.g., "un fly"). Some names are known in slightly different versions, easily recognizable by Spanish-speaking dancers, but may be confusing to the rest. Although the names of most calls are presently the same across the board, the different towns in Cuba use their own calls. This is because the pioneers of Rueda de Casino wanted to keep others from participating in their Rueda. Many local variations of the calls can now be found. They can change from town-to-town or even from teacher-to-teacher. There are many different variations of moves in Rueda de Casino.

The circle will either start from "al Medio" (normal closed hold with all the couples stepping in and out of the circle) or from Guapea (stepping forward on the inside foot and backward on the outside foot, tangent to the circle).  Some of the most common moves in Rueda include:  Dame, Enchufle, Vacila, and Sombrero. You can readily find an extensive list of Rueda de Casino moves in various websites. There are different hand motions that the caller can signal in case one's voice cannot be heard over the loud music. For example, the hand signal for Sombrero is the caller tapping the top of his or her head.

Filmography 
Rueda de Casino scenes may be seen in the movie Dance with Me and in the music video clip No me dejes de querer by Gloria Estefan. Rueda de casino dance may also be seen in the documentary film "La Salsa Cubana".

References

External links

  "A Rueda Wiki including streaming flash videos, Spanish pronunciation guides, an English translation of the calls and much more."
  Absolute Salsa - an extensive list of steps descriptions in English, Spanish and Italian
  "Rueda Calls & Descriptions"
  "Historia de la Rueda de Casino y la Salsa en Cuba"
  "The Norwegian Rueda Standard includes a Reference to more than 100 Rueda Calls, Translations of Spanish Rueda Calls into English (and Norwegian), links to Videos on YouTube and more."

Salsa
Group dances